Conus bandanus, common name the banded marble cone, is a species of sea snail, a marine gastropod mollusk in the family Conidae, the cone snails and their allies.

Like all species within the genus Conus, these snails are predatory and venomous. They are capable of "stinging" humans, therefore live ones should be handled carefully or not at all.

Description
The size of the shell varies between 45 mm and 150 mm. The color of the shell is white or light pink-white, with chocolate or chestnut reticulations, so arranged as to expose the crowded white in rounded triangular large spots. The colored markings form two irregular bands.  The aperture is white or light pink.

Distribution
This is an Indo-Pacific species, occurring of the Mascarene Basin, Mauritius and Tanzania

References

 Quoy, H. E. Th. & Gaimard, P., 1833 Voyage de la corvette l'Astrolabe, exécuté pendant les années 1826-1827-1828-1829, sous le commandement de M. J. Dumont d'Urville, Capitaine de Vaisseaux. Atlas
  Petit, R. E. (2009). George Brettingham Sowerby, I, II & III: their conchological publications and molluscan taxa. Zootaxa. 2189: 1–218

External links

 The Conus Biodiversity website
 Cone Shells – Knights of the Sea
 

bandanus
Gastropods described in 1792